Venezuela competed at the 2011 World Aquatics Championships in Shanghai, China between July 16 and 31, 2011.

Diving

Venezuela has qualified 5 athletes in diving.

Men

Women

Open water swimming

Men

Women

Mixed

Swimming

Venezuela qualified 8 swimmers.

Men

Women

Synchronised swimming

Venezuela has qualified 3 athletes in synchronised swimming.

Women

References

Nations at the 2011 World Aquatics Championships
2011 in Venezuelan sport
Venezuela at the World Aquatics Championships